Senator Heard may refer to:

Dallas Heard (born 1980s), Oregon State Senate
Fred W. Heard (born 1940), Oregon State Senate 
John T. Heard (1840–1927), Missouri State Senate 
William Henry Heard (1850–1937), South Carolina State Senate 
William Wright Heard (1853–1926), Louisiana State Senate